Kenny Lane (April 9, 1932 – August 5, 2008) was an American southpaw (left-handed) boxer. He fought for lightweight and light welterweight titles of the world, once against Joe Brown and twice against Carlos Ortiz.

Early life
Lane was raised on a farm in Big Rapids, Michigan with his four brothers and sister. According to his family, he regularly fought with his brothers and it is assumed that his southpaw stance was adopted to defend himself against his older brother who later became an Olympic boxer.

Professional boxing career
Lane was known for having a very unorthodox way of fighting. This combined with the fact that he was a southpaw made him an excellent boxer and in 1953 started his professional career.

Quote from Ortiz: "No one was more difficult to figure out than Kenny Lane, the guy was unbelievably clever" 

He had a controversial decision loss to Joe Brown for undisputed lightweight championship of the world.
He fought the Ortiz rubber match for light welterweight title.

Lane decided at age 50 to round out his professional career to 100 bouts.
He dropped to his fighting weight from almost 200 pounds.
After beating 3 much younger opponents he lost to the fourth.
Lane decided to retire for the final time, making the even 100 bouts he sought.

Family life
Lane married his wife Ruth as a teenager in West Virginia. They had 4 children.

Later years
After retiring Lane continued teaching boxing in the Lansing area. he ran the boxing program at the Lansing Gallo Recreation Center.

In 1995, British singer Morrissey released an album called Southpaw Grammar. The cover featured an old photograph of Lane from the April 1963 issue of The Ring magazine.

Lane was admitted into the World Boxing Hall of Fame in 2004.

Later in life Lane became an avid golfer and had a tournament named for him. He died of a heart attack on August 5, 2008, alongside one of his most well known students, Christian Lloyd in Lansing, Michigan.

Professional boxing record

References and notes

External links

Boxers from Michigan
2008 deaths
1932 births
American male boxers
Lightweight boxers